Callia gallegoi is a species of beetle in the family Cerambycidae. It was described by Galileo and Martins in 1991. It is known from Colombia.

References

Calliini
Beetles described in 1991